Yasumi Kobayashi (小林泰三) (7 August 1962 – 23 November 2020) was a Japanese author of horror, science fiction and mystery.

Career
His short story "The Man Who Watched the Sea" won the Hayakawa Award for best short story in 1998. Two more were nominated for the Seiun Award for best short story; "Sora kara Kaze ga Yamu Toki" in 2003, and "Arakajime Kettei Sareteiru Ashita" in 2004. He received the Seiun Award for novels in 2012 for Tengoku to jigoku, and in 2017 for Ultraman F. Nihon SF Taisho Award Award of Merit was awarded posthumously.

In 2009, he was nominated as "Best Foreign Author" in the Chinese-language Galaxy Awards.

Works in English translation
"C-City" (Lairs of the Hidden Gods, Volume 3: Straight to Darkness, Kurodahan Press, 2006)
"The Man Who Watched the Sea" (Speculative Japan 2, Kurodahan Press, 2011)

References

External links
 
Official website  
Entry in The Encyclopedia of Science Fiction

1962 births
2020 deaths
20th-century Japanese novelists
21st-century Japanese novelists
Japanese male short story writers
Japanese science fiction writers
Japanese horror writers
Japanese mystery writers
Osaka University alumni
Writers from Kyoto
20th-century Japanese short story writers
21st-century Japanese short story writers
20th-century Japanese male writers
21st-century male writers